Costa del Sol Sí Puede (Spanish for Costa del Sol Can, CSSP) is a political platform of popular unity, formed as an "instrumental party" that presented lists for the local elections of 2015 and 2019 in the comarca of Costa del Sol with a common platform. CSSP was supported by Podemos, Equo and local social collectives and movements. IULV-CA chose not to join the coalition. Since the 2015 elections, CSSP has moved on and is a totally independent party, with no relation to others. CSSP submits lists to the municipal elections in May 2019 in Torremolinos, Benalmadena, Mijas and Fuengirola. They lost all political power they had and the support of main political parties (Podemos, Equo, ...).

Election results
The party gained representation in some of the town councils of the Costa del Sol. They did not get any representation in cities such as Málaga and minor towns (Manilva, Casares, Vélez-Málaga, Nerja, Torrox, Rincón de la Victoria, Benahavís).

By 2019 the party did not participate in Estepona and Marbella, and lost all the city council seats they had. The party disappeared after the 2019 elections.

References

https://torremolinostv.com/santiago-rubio-anuncia-que-sera-candidato-a-la-alcaldia-de-torremolinos-por-cssp/

External links
Official website of CSSP

2015 establishments in Andalusia
Podemos (Spanish political party)
Political parties established in 2015
Political parties in Andalusia